Henry Arthur Mackie (January 17, 1878 – November 16, 1945) was a politician from Alberta, Canada.

Mackie was elected to the House of Commons of Canada in the 1917 Canadian federal election as a member of the Unionist coalition in the brand new electoral district of Edmonton East. He defeated Laurier Liberal candidate Alexander Esson May to win the riding.

Mackie was defeated running under the Conservative banner in the subsequent federal election in 1921 by Progressive Party of Canada candidate Donald Ferdinand Kellner. He finished a distant 3rd place behind Joseph Clarke.

External links
 

1878 births
1945 deaths
People from Estrie
Members of the House of Commons of Canada from Alberta
Unionist Party (Canada) MPs
Anglophone Quebec people